Not be confused with Robert M. Young (director).

Robert William Young (born 16 March 1933) is a British television and film director.

Young was born in Cheltenham, and in the 1980s and early 1990s, established himself as a leading director of British TV drama. In the 1970s, he directed Vampire Circus (1972), Soldier's Home (1977) and an episode of Hammer House of Horror. He directed several episodes of Minder and Bergerac in the early 1980s, and the acclaimed TV serial The Mad Death which centred on a rabies outbreak. Perhaps his best remembered television work was on Robin of Sherwood, for which he directed many of the best-regarded episodes.

Young moved towards black comedy in the early 1990s, directing Jeeves and Wooster based on the stories written by P.G. Wodehouse, and G.B.H., for which he was nominated for a BAFTA award. It was partly on the strength of GBH that he was assigned to direct Fierce Creatures, John Cleese's 1997 follow-up to A Fish Called Wanda, which featured many of the same cast as GBH. However, the production ran into problems and Fred Schepisi was brought in to finalise the movie.  Young did, however, direct Splitting Heirs, which starred Cleese and Eric Idle.

Young has continued to work on television drama since then.

Selected filmography
1972: Vampire Circus
1974: Romance with a Double Bass (short film)
1976: Keep It Up Downstairs
1977: Soldier's Home (short film)
1979: The World Is Full of Married Men
1986: The Worst Witch (TV)
1986: The Ninja Squad
1987: Three Wishes for Jamie (TV)
1987: Harry's Kingdom
1991: G.B.H. (TV miniseries)
1993: Splitting Heirs
1994: Doomsday Gun (TV)
1997: Fierce Creatures
1997: Jane Eyre (TV)
1999: Captain Jack
2001: The Infinite Worlds of H. G. Wells (TV miniseries)
2007: Blood Monkey
2007: Eichmann
2010: Wide Blue Yonder
2014: Curse of the Phoenix

References

External links
 

1933 births
Living people
British film directors
British television directors